Cosmotriche discitincta is a moth of the family Lasiocampidae first described by Alfred Ernest Wileman in 1914. It is found in Nepal and Taiwan.

Subspecies
Cosmotriche discitincta discitincta (Taiwan)
Cosmotriche discitincta szini Zolotuhin, 2001 (Nepal)

References

Moths described in 1914
Lasiocampidae